Three-time defending champion Martina Navratilova defeated Chris Evert Lloyd in a rematch of the previous year's final, 4–6, 6–3, 6–2 to win the ladies' singles tennis title at the 1985 Wimbledon Championships. It was her sixth Wimbledon singles title and twelfth major singles title overall. It marked Evert's seventh runner-up finish at Wimbledon, the joint-most at a major (shared with Blanche Bingley, also at Wimbledon).

Seeds

  Chris Evert Lloyd (final)
  Martina Navratilova (champion)
 n/a 
  Hana Mandlíková (third round)
  Manuela Maleeva (fourth round)
  Pam Shriver (quarterfinals)
  Claudia Kohde-Kilsch (second round)
  Helena Suková (quarterfinals)
  Zina Garrison (semifinals)
  Bonnie Gadusek (second round)
  Kathy Jordan (second round)
  Steffi Graf (fourth round)
  Catarina Lindqvist (first round)
  Carling Bassett (second round)
  Wendy Turnbull (third round)
  Gabriela Sabatini (third round)
  Kathy Rinaldi (semifinals)

Both Chris Evert Lloyd and Martina Navratilova were seeded #1, reflecting Evert Lloyd's status as the #1 ranked player and Navratilova's as the 3-time defending champion, with no seed #2 awarded. This unique decision was heavily criticised by the Women's Tennis Association. As Evert Lloyd was placed at the top of the draw sheet, she was in effect the de facto #1.

Qualifying

Draw

Finals

Top half

Section 1

Section 2

Section 3

Section 4

Bottom half

Section 5

Section 6

Section 7

Section 8

See also
 Evert–Navratilova rivalry

References

External links

1985 Wimbledon Championships – Women's draws and results at the International Tennis Federation

Women's Singles
Wimbledon Championship by year – Women's singles
Wimbledon Championships
Wimbledon Championships